The church of the Santissimo Nome di Maria e degli Angeli Custodi, commonly known as the Church of the  Scuole Pie, is a church in central Genoa, located a few metres away from the Cathedral of Genoa.

The church was built on property belonging to the community of Piarist or Scolopi fathers (members of the Order of Poor Clerics Regular of the Mother of God of the Pious Schools,  who had come to the city to establish a school from the town of Savona in the 16th century. Church construction began in 1712, and was completed by around 1770. 

Among the artists completing frescoes in the interior were Giuseppe Galeotti and Andrea Leoncini. Galeotti painted the Saints Jerome, Ambrogio, Gregory, and Augustine in the Pilasters. Leoncini frescoed Giuseppe Calasanzio (the founder of the order of the scolopi). 
Francesco Maria Schiaffino designed nine relief sculptures present in the church, and died (1765) before they were all completed by his studio.  The three representing the Nativity, Mary at the Temple, and Young Jesus among the Scholars, while the Marriage of Mary, the Annunciation, the Visitation of Anne, the Assumption of the Virgin, the Descent of the Holy Spirit, and Flight to Egypt were by pupils, including this last once completed by a young Nicolò Traverso). The statue of Mary at the main altar was completed  by Tommaso Orsolino, while a painting of the Guardian Angel was completed by Giovanni Paolo Oderico.

Notes

Roman Catholic churches completed in 1770
Nome
Baroque architecture in Liguria
1712 establishments in Italy
18th-century Roman Catholic church buildings in Italy